In mathematics, the Teichmüller space  of a (real) topological (or differential) surface , is a space that parametrizes complex structures on  up to the action of homeomorphisms that are isotopic to the identity homeomorphism. Teichmüller spaces are named after Oswald Teichmüller.

It can be viewed as a moduli space for marked hyperbolic structure on the surface, and this endows it with a natural topology for which it is homeomorphic to a ball of dimension  for a surface of genus . In this way Teichmüller space can be viewed as the universal covering orbifold of the Riemann moduli space.

The Teichmüller space has a canonical complex manifold structure and a wealth of natural metrics. The study of geometric features of these various structures is an active body of research.

The sub-field of mathematics that studies the Teichmüller space is called Teichmüller theory.

History 

Moduli spaces for Riemann surfaces and related Fuchsian groups have been studied since the work of Bernhard Riemann (1826-1866), who knew that  parameters were needed to describe the variations of complex structures on a surface of genus . The early study of Teichmüller space, in the late nineteenth–early twentieth century, was geometric and founded on the interpretation of Riemann surfaces as hyperbolic surfaces. Among the main contributors were Felix Klein, Henri Poincaré, Paul Koebe, Jakob Nielsen, Robert Fricke and Werner Fenchel.

The main contribution of Teichmüller to the study of moduli was the introduction of quasiconformal mappings to the subject. They allow us to give much more depth to the study of moduli spaces by endowing them with additional features that were not present in the previous, more elementary works. After World War II the subject was developed further in this analytic vein, in particular by Lars Ahlfors and Lipman Bers. The theory continues to be active, with numerous studies of the complex structure of Teichmüller space (introduced by Bers).

The geometric vein in the study of Teichmüller space was revived following the work of William Thurston in the late 1970s, who introduced a geometric compactification which he used in his study of the mapping class group of a surface. Other more combinatorial objects associated to this group (in particular the curve complex) have also been related to Teichmüller space, and this is a very active subject of research in geometric group theory.

Definitions

Teichmüller space from complex structures 

Let  be an orientable smooth surface (a differentiable manifold of dimension 2).

Formally it can be defined as follows.

Another equivalent definition is as follows:  is the space of pairs  where  is a Riemann surface and  a diffeomorphism, and two pairs  are regarded as equivalent if  is isotopic to a holomorphic diffeomorphism. Such a pair is called a marked Riemann surface; the marking being the diffeomeorphism; another definition of markings is by systems of curves.

The Teichmüller space of the torus and flat metrics 

The next example is the torus  In this case any complex structure can be realised by a Riemann surface of the form  (a complex elliptic curve) for a complex number  where

 

is the complex upper half-plane. Then we have a bijection:

Finite type surfaces 

These are the surfaces for which Teichmüller space is most often studied, which include closed surfaces. A surface is of finite type if it is diffeomorphic to a compact surface minus a finite set.

Teichmüller spaces and hyperbolic metrics 

Every finite type orientable surface other than the ones above admits complete Riemannian metrics of constant curvature . For a given surface of finite type there is a bijection between such metrics and complex structures as follows from the uniformisation theorem.

The topology on Teichmüller space 

In all cases computed above there is an obvious topology on Teichmüller space. In the general case there are many natural ways to topologise , perhaps the simplest is via hyperbolic metrics and length functions.

 

Then the map

is an embedding. With this topology  is homeomorphic to 

In fact one can obtain an embedding with  curves, and even . In both case one can use the embedding to give a geometric proof of the homeomorphism above.

More examples of small Teichmüller spaces 

There is a unique complete hyperbolic metric of finite volume on the three-holed sphere and so the Teichmüller space of finite-volume complete metrics of constant curvature  is a point (this also follows from the dimension formula of the previous paragraph).

Teichmüller space and conformal structures 

Instead of complex structures of hyperbolic metrics one can define Teichmüller space using conformal structures. Indeed, conformal structures are the same as complex structures in two (real) dimensions. Moreover, the Uniformisation Theorem also implies that in each conformal class of Riemannian metrics on a surface there is a unique metric of constant curvature.

Teichmüller spaces as representation spaces 

Yet another interpretation of Teichmüller space is as a representation space for surface groups.

This can be used to see the homeomorphism  directly.

This interpretation of Teichmüller space is generalised by higher Teichmüller theory, where the group  is replaced by an arbitrary semisimple Lie group.

A remark on categories 

All definitions above can be made in the topological category instead of the category of differentiable manifolds, and this does not change the objects.

Infinite-dimensional Teichmüller spaces 

Surfaces which are not of finite type also admit hyperbolic structures, which can be parametrised by infinite-dimensional spaces (homeomorphic to ). Another example of infinite-dimensional space related to Teichmüller theory is the Teichmüller space of a lamination by surfaces.

Action of the mapping class group and relation to moduli space

The map to moduli space 

It is a covering map, and since  is simply connected it is the orbifold universal cover for the moduli space.

Action of the mapping class group 

The group of diffeomorphisms acts naturally on Teichmüller space by 
 
If  is a mapping class and  two diffeomorphisms representing it then they are isotopic.

The action of the mapping class group  on the Teichmüller space is properly discontinuous, and the quotient is the moduli space.

Fixed points 

The Nielsen realisation problem asks whether any finite subgroup of the mapping class group has a global fixed point (a point fixed by all group elements) in Teichmüller space. This was solved by Steven Kerckhoff.

Coordinates

Fenchel–Nielsen coordinates 

The Fenchel–Nielsen coordinates (so named after Werner Fenchel and Jakob Nielsen) on the Teichmüller space  are associated to a pants decomposition of the surface . This is a decomposition of  into pairs of pants, and to each curve in the decomposition is associated its length in the hyperbolic metric corresponding to the point in Teichmüller space, and another real parameter called the twist which is more involved to define.

The Fenchel–Nielsen coordinates in fact define a homeomorphism .

In the case of a surface with punctures some pairs of pants are "degenerate" (they have a cusp) and give only two length and twist parameters. Again in this case the Fenchel–Nielsen coordinates define a homeomorphism .

Shear coordinates 

If  the surface  admits ideal triangulations (whose vertices are exactly the punctures). By the formula for the Euler characteristic such a triangulation has  triangles. The parameters for such a structure are the translation lengths for each pair of sides of the triangles glued in the triangulation. These coordinates are called shear coordinates.

For closed surfaces, a pair of pants can be decomposed as the union of two ideal triangles (it can be seen as an incomplete hyperbolic metric on the three-holed sphere).

Earthquakes 

A simple earthquake path in Teichmüller space is a path determined by varying a single shear or length Fenchel–Nielsen coordinate (for a fixed ideal triangulation of a surface). The name comes from seeing the ideal triangles or the pants as tectonic plates and the shear as plate motion.

More generally one can do earthquakes along geodesic laminations. A theorem of Thurston then states that two points in Teichmüller space are joined by a unique earthquake path.

Analytic theory

Quasiconformal mappings 

A quasiconformal mapping between two Riemann surfaces is a homeomorphism which deforms the conformal structure in a bounded manner over the surface. More precisely it is differentiable almost everywhere and there is a constant , called the dilatation, such that

where  are the derivatives in a conformal coordinate  and its conjugate .

There are quasi-conformal mappings in every isotopy class and so an alternative definition for The Teichmüller space is as follows.

Quadratic differentials and the Bers embedding 

With the definition above, if  there is a natural map from Teichmüller space to the space of -equivariant solutions to the Beltrami differential equation. The space of those is a complex space of complex dimension , and the image of Teichmüller space is an open set. This map is called the Bers embedding.

Teichmüller mappings 

This map is called a Teichmüller mapping.

In the geometric picture this means that for every two diffeomorphic Riemann surfaces  and diffeomorphism  there exists two polygons representing  and an affine map sending one to the other, which has smallest dilatation among all quasiconformal maps .

Metrics

The Teichmüller metric 
If  and the Teichmüller mapping between them has dilatation  then the Teichmüller distance between them is by definition . This is the metric most commonly used for the study of the metric geometry of Teichmüller space. In particular it is of interest to geometric group theorists.

The Weil–Petersson metric 

The Weil–Petersson metric is the Riemannian metric defined by the  inner product on quadratic differentials.

Compactifications

There are several inequivalent compactifications of Teichmüller spaces that have been studied. Several of the earlier compactifications depend on the choice of a point in Teichmüller space so are not invariant under the modular group, which can be inconvenient. William Thurston later found a compactification without this disadvantage, which has become the most widely used compactification.

Thurston compactification

By looking at the hyperbolic lengths of simple closed curves for each point in Teichmüller space and taking the closure in the (infinite-dimensional) projective space,  introduced a compactification whose points at infinity correspond to projective measured laminations. The compactified space is homeomorphic to a closed ball. This Thurston compactification is acted on continuously by the modular group. In particular any element of the modular group has a fixed point in Thurston's compactification, which Thurston used in his classification of elements of the modular group.

Bers compactification

The Bers embedding depends on the choice of a point in Teichmüller space so is not invariant under the modular group, and in fact the modular group does not act continuously on the Bers compactification.

Teichmüller compactification

The "points at infinity" in the Teichmüller compactification consist of geodesic rays (for the Teichmüller metric) starting at a fixed basepoint. This compactification depends on the choice of basepoint so is not acted on by the modular group, and in fact Kerckhoff showed that the action of the modular group on Teichmüller space does not extend to a continuous action on this compactification.

Gardiner–Masur compactification

 considered a compactification similar to the Thurston compactification, but using extremal length rather than hyperbolic length. The modular group acts continuously on this compactification, but they showed that their compactification has strictly more points at infinity.

Large-scale geometry 

There has been an extensive study of the geometric properties of Teichmüller space endowed with the Teichmüller metric. Known large-scale properties include:

Teichmüller space  contains flat subspaces of dimension , and there are no higher-dimensional quasi-isometrically embedded flats.

On the other hand, Teichmüller space exhibits several properties characteristic of hyperbolic spaces, such as:

Some geodesics behave like they do in hyperbolic space.
Random walks on Teichmüller space converge almost surely to a point on the Thurston boundary.

Some of these features can be explained by the study of maps from Teichmüller space to the curve complex, which is known to be hyperbolic.

Complex geometry 

The Bers embedding gives  a complex structure as an open subset of

Metrics coming from the complex structure 

Since Teichmüller space is a complex manifold it carries a Carathéodory metric. Teichmüller space is Kobayashi hyperbolic and its Kobayashi metric coincides with the Teichmüller metric. This latter result is used in Royden's proof that the mapping class group is the full group of isometries for the Teichmüller metric.

The Bers embedding realises Teichmüller space as a domain of holomorphy and hence it also carries a Bergman metric.

Kähler metrics on Teichmüller space

The Weil–Petersson metric is Kähler but it is not complete.

Cheng and Yau showed that there is a unique complete Kähler–Einstein metric on Teichmüller space. It has constant negative scalar curvature.

Teichmüller space also carries a complete Kähler metric of bounded sectional curvature introduced by  that is Kähler-hyperbolic.

Equivalence of metrics 

With the exception of the incomplete Weil–Petersson metric, all metrics on Teichmüller space introduced here are quasi-isometric to each other.

See also 
 Moduli of algebraic curves
 p-adic Teichmüller theory
 Inter-universal Teichmüller theory
 Teichmüller modular form

References

Sources

Further reading

 The last volume contains translations of several of Teichmüller's papers.

Riemann surfaces
Moduli theory
Differential geometry
Geometric group theory